ISO 3166-2:MN is the entry for Mongolia in ISO 3166-2, part of the ISO 3166 standard published by the International Organization for Standardization (ISO), which defines codes for the names of the principal subdivisions (e.g., provinces or states) of all countries coded in ISO 3166-1.

Currently for Mongolia, ISO 3166-2 codes are defined for 1 capital city and 21 provinces. The capital of the country Ulaanbaatar has special status equal to the provinces.

Each code consists of two parts, separated by a hyphen. The second part is either of the following:
 one digit: capital city
 three digits: provinces

Current codes
Subdivision names are listed as in the ISO 3166-2 standard published by the ISO 3166 Maintenance Agency (ISO 3166/MA).

Click on the button in the header to sort each column.

See also
 Subdivisions of Mongolia
 FIPS region codes of Mongolia

External links
 ISO Online Browsing Platform: MN
 Provinces of Mongolia, Statoids.com

2:MN
ISO 3166-2
Mongolia geography-related lists